Jewish writers by country:

Austria
Britain
Canada
France
Germany
Hungary
Israel
Netherlands
Poland
Russia
United States
authors
journalists
poets
playwrights

See also
List of Yiddish language poets
List of North European Jews
List of East European Jews
List of West European Jews
List of Latin American Jews

Journalism lists
Literature lists